Yaare Neenu Cheluve is a 1998 Indian Kannada-language romantic drama film directed by D. Rajendra Babu and produced by Rockline Venkatesh. The film stars Ravichandran, Sangita and Heera Rajagopal. Popular actors such as Vishnuvardhan, Ramesh Aravind, Jaggesh and Prakash Raj are seen in special appearances in the film.

The film was a remake of Tamil film Kadhal Kottai. Heera reprised her original role in this version as well.

The film released in 1998 to generally positive reviews from critics. The songs composed by Hamsalekha was received well and was at the top of the charts for many weeks. He was awarded with the Best Music Director award at the 1998 Filmfare Awards South.

Plot 
Kamali (Sangita), a graduate, lives with her sister, Malliga (Jyothi) and brother-in-law Shekar (Prakash Raj) in Kuduremukha, and is searching for a job. While visiting Bangalore, her purse is stolen and she fears she has lost her academic credentials. Surya (Ravichandran)  an orphaned, carefree man who works in Jaipur, finds the purse and sends it back to her, and a love develops through letters and phone calls. They agree to love each other without meeting, as she sews and sends a gift pack containing a Rose embroidered woollen sweater for him to wear when they meet for real. Surya soon shifts to Bangalore for work and stays with Shivu (Jaggesh). Kamali too comes to Bangalore to find a job and stays with her friend Mary (Tara).  Dayana (Heera Rajagopal), Surya's boss, is immediately smitten by him, but her repeated attempts in gaining his love and affections fails as he is staunch about his love for Kamali. In the meantime, Surya and Kamali run over upon each other without knowing who they really were, resulting in negative perception and misunderstanding. Refusing a job offer which would move her to Singapore, making it difficult for her to find Surya, Kamali moves back to her home in despair. Unable to withstand the advances of Dayana, Surya quits his job and gets sheltered by Vishnu (Vishnuvardhan), who arranges him an autorickshaw to drive for a living. Ramesh (Ramesh Aravind), a wealthy businessman expresses his interest in marrying Kamali, but Kamali excuses herself to consider her as prospective bride when she meets Shivu in private and shares her unflinching love for Surya, who even allows her to meet him for one last time. Shekar, who initially dissuades Kamali's love finally gives in and allows her to go to Bangalore half-heartedly. Upon arriving in Bangalore, which is experiencing severe monsoon, Kamali finds out that Mary and the other hostel mates are not in town. Pinning hopes, she boards the Surya's autorickshaw, without knowing that it is him, and searches for him desperately. At the end of the day, both of them get refreshed at his place, where he dons the sweater gifted by her, covering it with his uniform. As Kamali plans to head home, depressed, Surya helps her to board the Davanagere Express. As the train departs, in a turn of events, Surya removes his shirt wherein Kamali notices the sweater, and the pair finally unite, as Vishnu and Mary look on and rejoice.

Cast
 Ravichandran as Surya
 Sangita as Kamali
 Heera as Diana
 Tara as Mary
 Doddanna
 Sadhu Kokila

Special appearance
 Vishnuvardhan as Vishnu
 Ramesh Aravind as Ramesh
 Jaggesh as Shivu
 Prakash Raj as Kamli's Brother-in-law
 Ramji as Dancer in song "Chakkotha Chakkotha"

Soundtrack
The music of the film was composed and lyrics written by Hamsalekha.

Reception
The Hindu wrote "Multiple starrers are almost unknown to Kannada cinema and the credit for introducing a galaxy of mega stars goes to Rockline Productions whose "Yaare Neenu Cheluve" has formidable names such as Vishnuvardhan, Ravichandran, Ramesh. Jaggesh and Prakash Rai, making it perhaps the first such star-studded venture. But the film's merit-worthiness stops here, the acting prowess of its stars notwithstanding. For, it is a straight remake of the Tamil hit "Kaadal Kottai" So, it comes a cipher where creativity and originality are concerned although Rajendra Babu can be credited as the captain for a film which is technically and musically superior." In contrast, Deccan Herald wrote "The story just falls flat on its face and fails to live up to even half the expectations of its Tamil original."

Awards
 1998 - Filmfare Best Music Director - Hamsalekha

References

External links
 Deccan Herald review

1998 films
1990s Kannada-language films
Indian romantic drama films
1998 romantic drama films
Kannada remakes of Tamil films
Films shot in Rajasthan
Films scored by Hamsalekha
Films directed by D. Rajendra Babu